Chevel Shepherd (born June 18, 2002) is an American country singer. She is the winner of season 15 of the American talent competition The Voice at the age of 16. She was coached by Kelly Clarkson and became the first country artist to win the show that wasn't a part of Team Blake. On May 26, 2019, She performed God Bless America before the 2019 Indianapolis 500.

Early life
Chevel Shepherd was born on June 18, 2002, in Farmington, New Mexico.

Career
In 2018, Shepherd entered the 15th season of The Voice. In her blind audition, she sang "If I Die Young" by The Band Perry. Kelly Clarkson, Jennifer Hudson and Blake Shelton turned, and Chevel chose to be a part of Team Kelly. She made it to the finale and won the competition on December 18, 2018.

The Voice (2018)

The Voice performances

Filmography

Tours

Opening
Red Pill Blues Tour (2019)

Discography

Albums
Everybody's Got a Story (2021)

Singles

Awards and nominations

References

External links
 

2002 births
21st-century American singers
21st-century American women singers
American women country singers
American country singer-songwriters
American new wave musicians
Living people
People from Farmington, New Mexico
Republic Records artists
Singers from New Mexico
The Voice (franchise) winners
Universal Music Group artists